Rajkumar Sharma, was born in Saharanpur, Uttar Pradesh on 18 June 1965, and is a cricket coach and a former Ranji Trophy player.

Rajkumar Sharma was a right-handed batsman and a right-arm off break bowler. He represented Delhi in First Class Cricket (1986-1991) matches and also some List A matches.

On 29 September 2016, He was awarded Dronacharya Award for his coaching.

He appointed coach of Malta national cricket team for 2019 Spain Triangular T20I Series from 29 to 31 March 2019.

Rajkumar Sharma is now a bowling coach of the senior men’s team of the Delhi & District Cricket Association (DDCA)

Sharma founded West Delhi Cricket Academy on 30 May 1998.  The academy is known for training batsmen like Virat Kohli.

References

External links 

West Delhi Cricket Academy

Indian cricketers
Delhi cricketers
1965 births
Living people
Punjabi people
Recipients of the Dronacharya Award